General elections were held in Bahrain for the first time on 12 December 1973. 30 seats out of the 44-seated unicameral National Assembly were contested, the other 14 were ex officio. Of the 24,883 registered voters, 19,509 cast a ballot, giving a voter turnout of 78.4%.

Two distinct political blocs amongst the elected members; the "People's Bloc" consisted of eight Shia and Sunni members elected from urban areas and associated with left-wing and nationalist organizations, including the Popular Front for the Liberation of Bahrain, the National Liberation Front – Bahrain or the Baathist movement. The 'Religious Bloc' was made up of six Shia members mostly from rural constituencies. The remaining members were independents with shifting positions.

Electoral system
The elections were held under the 1973 constitution. The 44-seat National Assembly had thirty members elected by a franchise restricted to male citizens, with an additional 14 ministers of the royally-appointed government becoming ex officio members.

Elected members
The elected members of the 1973 national assembly were:

Aftermath
In 1975 the Assembly was dissolved by the then ruler Sheikh Isa bin Salman Al Khalifa because it refused to pass the government sponsored State Security Law of 1974. Isa subsequently refused to allow the Assembly to meet again or hold elections during his lifetime. The next parliamentary elections were held in 2002 after a gap of 27 years. During that period, Bahrain was run by the royally-appointed government under emergency laws.

References

1973
Bahrain
General election
1973 general election
Non-partisan elections